The 1889 Grand National was the 51st renewal of the Grand National horse race that took place at Aintree near Liverpool, England, on 29 March 1889.

Finishing Order

Non-finishers

References

 1889
Grand National
Grand National
19th century in Lancashire